Razboyna is a village located in the northeastern part of Bulgaria in Targovishte Municipality, Targovishte Province.

Razboyna is situated at the northern foot of the Preslav Mountain just by the ring road of Targovishte. The village lies in the vicinity of the Polyanitsa Reservoir. Although it has its own mayoralty, the village is considered as a quarter or suburb of the town of Targovishte. It is connected to the town's public transport system.

The majority of Razboyna's population consist of Turks who are Sunni Muslims, closely followed by Bulgarians who are Orthodox Christians. Its population have mostly settled in Razboyna during the communist rule. There is a community centre (chitalishte) in the village, registered as number 2750 by the Ministry of Culture (Bulgaria). The road that pass through Razboyna leads to a forest land, called Sondite, which is part of the Preslav Mountain. The site is known for its glades filled with lilac shrubs and red peonies.

Gallery

Notes

References
Razboyna Guide
Official Government Registration List

External links
Satellite Map

Villages in Targovishte Province